Calosoma vermiculatum is a species of ground beetle in the subfamily of Carabinae. It was described by Straneo in 1942.

References

vermiculatum
Beetles described in 1942